The 1961 National Challenge Cup was the 48th edition of the USSFA's annual open soccer championship.  The Philadelphia Ukrainians defeated the Los Angeles Scots to win.

Final

References
 * 

Lamar Hunt U.S. Open Cup
U.S. Open Cup